Japanese musical artist Kitaro's discography consists of 24 studio albums, 8 live albums, 14 soundtrack albums, and 42 compilation albums. Kitaro's latest project, Symphony Live In Istanbul was nominated for the 57th Annual Grammy Awards, and is Kitaro's 16th Grammy nomination to date.

He also appears in five full-length concert videos and has composed scores for numerous films including Oliver Stone's Heaven & Earth, Impressions of the West Lake, and The Soong Sisters. He won Golden Globe Award Best Original Score for Heaven & Earth and won Golden Horse Award and Hong Kong Film Award for The Soong Sisters (1997).

He has collaborated with various artists including Megadeth's Marty Friedman, Mickey Hart, Philip Glass, Dennis Banks, Jon Anderson of Yes and Jane Zhang, as well as appearing on four Far East Family Band albums.

Studio albums
15 of these studio albums were nominated for a Grammy Award.  Thinking of You won a Grammy Award for Best New Age Album in 2000.

Soundtracks
Impression of the West Lake is one of the Grammy nominated albums.

Live albums

Compilation albums

Singles

Music videos

Far East Family Band

Collaborations

Reissues

References

External links
Kitaro Official site (English)
Kitaro Official site (Japanese)
Kitaro TV – Kitaro's official YouTube page
Kitaro House - Website with full discography

 Discography
Discographies of Japanese artists